Payal Kapadia is an Indian filmmaker. She is best known for having won the Golden Eye award for best documentary film at the 2021 Cannes Film Festival for her film A Night of Knowing Nothing. In 2017, her film Afternoon Clouds was the only Indian film that was selected for the 70th Cannes Film Festival.

Biography 
Born in Mumbai, Kapadia went to Rishi Valley School in Andhra Pradesh. She got a Bachelor's degree in economics from St. Xavier's College, Mumbai. She did a one-year Master's degree from Sophia college. She then went on to study film direction at the Film and Television Institute of India, where she was selected on her second attempt.

Filmography 
Watermelon, Fish and Half Ghost
The Last Mango Before the Monsoon (2015)
Afternoon Clouds (2017)
And What is the Summer Saying (2018)
A Night of Knowing Nothing (2021)

References 

Indian women film directors
Indian women documentary filmmakers
Living people
Year of birth missing (living people)